The Men's 5000 metres at the 1988 Summer Olympics in Seoul, South Korea had an entry list of 56 competitors, with three qualifying heats (56) and two semifinals (30) before the final (15) took place on Saturday October 1, 1988.

The race started off tactically, with Stefano Mei taking the point for a slow first lap, then Evgeni Ignatov accelerating for a faster second lap.  900 metres into the race, John Ngugi went all in, coming from the back of the pack, passing the field and dropping a sub-60 lap.  The field scrambled and strung out in chase but soon he had a 15-metre gap.  Another 61 second lap and he had 30 metres.  Ngugi slowed to a more rational pace, but still have a 40-metre breakaway on the peloton, led by John Doherty.  With five and a half laps to go, Domingos Castro went around Doherty to lead the effort to bridge the gap.  Castro's move strung out the pack, as Castro separated himself from the other chasers and closed down on Ngugi's gap.  Castro eventually had a larger gap on the pack than Ngugi had on him, at the bell six seconds on the leader of the pack who was now Dieter Baumann.  Ngugi began to widen his gap on Castro and trotted home to the win unchallenged.  Behind Castro, Baumann and Hansjörg Kunze were sprinting in a battle for bronze.  30 metres from the finish, Baumann caught the exhausted Castro.  Five metres before the finish, Kunze also sprinted past Castro, both (West and East respectively) German runners running about a 56-second last lap.

Medalists

Records
These were the standing world and Olympic records (in minutes) prior to the 1988 Summer Olympics.

Final

Non-qualifiers
 Eliminated in the semi-finals

 Eliminated in the heats

See also
 1987 Men's World Championships 5.000 metres (Rome)
 1990 Men's European Championships 5.000 metres (Split)
 1991 Men's World Championships 5.000 metres (Tokyo)
 1992 Men's Olympic 5.000 metres (Barcelona)

References

External links
  Official Report

 1
5000 metres at the Olympics
Men's events at the 1988 Summer Olympics